Nanyangosaurus is a genus of herbivorous ornithischian dinosaur belonging to Hadrosauroidea that lived in the Late Cretaceous of present-day Henan Province, China.

In 1994 the remains of Nanyangosaurus were found near the village of Houzhuang, in Neixiang county in Henan. The type species, Nanyangosaurus zhugeii, was described by Xu Xing, Zhao Xijin, Lü Junchang, Huang Wanbo, Li Zhanyang and Dong Zhiming in 2000. The generic name is derived from the city of Nanyang. The specific name honours one of the most famous historic inhabitants of that city, the legendary strategist Zhuge Liang.
 
The specimen, holotype IVPP V 11821, was excavated in the Xiaguan Formation dating to the Turonian-Campanian stages. It consists of a partial skeleton lacking the skull. Eight posterior dorsal vertebrae, a sacrum of six vertebrae and a tail of thirty-six vertebrae have been preserved, together with a partial ischium, a forelimb and a hindlimb. The describers considered Nanyangosaurus to be of Albian age because of its primitiveness, but the type horizon is now believed to be Turonian-Campanian in age based on plant and invertebrate fossils.

Nanyangosaurus was a rather small euornithpod with an estimated length of four to five metres. The length of the femur is 517 millimetres. The forelimbs were relatively long with a long hand. The first digit of the hand was completely absent including the first metacarpal; according to the describers this was not an accident of preservation but the actual condition of the living animal. The species would then not have possessed the thumb spike typical of its relatives.

According to a cladistic analysis performed by the describers, Nanyangosaurus was a basal member of the Iguanodontia, more derived than Probactrosaurus and closely related to the Hadrosauroidea.

Notes

Late Cretaceous dinosaurs of Asia
Iguanodonts
Fossil taxa described in 2000
Paleontology in Henan
Taxa named by Lü Junchang
Taxa named by Xu Xing
Taxa named by Dong Zhiming
Nanyang, Henan
Ornithischian genera